Crossea is a genus of very small sea snails or micromolluscs, marine gastropod molluscs in the family Conradiidae.

Distribution
Species in this marine genus occur off the Gulf of Oman, Japan, New Zealand, South Africa; off Australia (New South Wales, Northern Territory, Queensland, South Australia, Tasmania, Victoria).

Species
Species within the genus Crossea include:
 Crossea alliciens Melvill, 1910
 Crossea biconica Hedley, 1902
 Crossea cordata Rubio & Rolán, 2019
 Crossea eryma Melvill, 1906
 Crossea exornata Rubio & Rolán, 2019
 Crossea extrema Rubio & Rolán, 2019
 Crossea gatliffi Hedley, 1902
 Crossea gemmata Hedley, 1912
 Crossea miranda A. Adams, 1865
 Crossea nicober Rubio & Rolán, 2019
 Crossea regularis Rubio & Rolán, 2019
 Crossea sepcris Rubio & Rolán, 2019
 Crossea spiralis Rubio & Rolán, 2019
 Crossea striata Watson, 1883
 Crossea ulevidens Rubio & Rolán, 2019
 Crossea ultidepre Rubio & Rolán, 2019
 Crossea vanuatuensis Rubio & Rolán, 2019
 Crossea veraspiralis Rubio & Rolán, 2019
 Crossea victori Poppe, Tagaro & Stahlschmidt, 2015

The following species were brought into synonymy:
 Crossea agulhasensis Thiele, J. 1925: synonym of  Crossea striata Watson, 1883
 Crossea bellula A. Adams, 1865: synonym of Crosseola bellula (A. Adams, 1865) (original combination)
 Crossea cancellata Tenison-Woods, 1878: synonym of Crosseola cancellata (Tenison Woods, 1878) (original combination)
 Crossea carinata Hedley, 1903: synonym of Cirsonella carinata (Hedley, 1903)
 Crossea concinna Angas, 1867: synonym of Crosseola concinna (Angas, 1867)
 Crossea consobrina May, 1915: synonym of Crosseola concinna (Angas, 1867)
 Crossea glabella Murdoch, 1908: synonym of Conjectura glabella (Murdoch, 1908)
 Crossea inverta Hedley, 1907: synonym of Crosseola inverta (Hedley, 1907) (original combination)
 Crossea labiata Tenison-Woods, 1876: synonym of Dolicrossea labiata (Tenison-Woods, 1876)
 Crossea naticoides Hedley, C., 1907: synonym of Cirsonella naticoides (Hedley, 1907); synonym of Cirsonella weldii (Tenison-Woods, 1877)

References

 A. Adams, 1865, On some new genera of Mollusca from the seas of Japan The Annals and Magazine of Natural History ser. 3, 15: 333
 Iredale, 1924 Proceedings of the Linnean Society of New South Wales, 49(3): 183, 251
 Cotton, B. C. (1959). South Australian Mollusca. Archaeogastropoda. Adelaide. : W.L. Hawes. 449 pp., 1 pl.
 Higo, S., Callomon, P. & Goto, Y. (1999) Catalogue and Bibliography of the Marine Shell-Bearing Mollusca of Japan. Elle Scientific Publications, Yao, Japan, 749 pp
 Rubio F. & Rolán E. (2019). New species of Conradiidae Golikov & Starobogatov, 1987 (= Crosseolidae Hickman, 2013) (Gastropoda: Trochoidea) from the Tropical Indo-Pacific – I. The genus Crossea. Novapex. 20(1-2): 13-34

External links
 Fischer P. (1880-1887). Manuel de Conchyliologie et de Paléontologie Conchyliologique. Paris, Savy pp. XXIV + 1369 + pl. 23. Fasc. 1: pp. 1-112 [21. 9. 1880]. Fasc. 2: pp. 113–192 [16. 3. 1881]. Fasc. 3: pp. 193–304 [28. 7. 1881]. Fasc. 4: pp. 305–416 [5. 5. 1882]. Fasc. 5: pp. 417–512 [21. 2. 1883]. Fasc. 6: pp. 513–608 [20. 12. 1883]. Fasc. 7: pp. 609–688 [30. 6. 1884]. Fasc. 8: pp. 689–784 [29. 1. 1885]. Fasc. 9: pp. 785–896 [31. 8. 1885]. Fasc. 10: pp. 897–1008 [30. 4. 1886]. Fasc. 11: pp. 1009–1369 
 H. (1913). Manual of the New Zealand Mollusca with an atlas of quarto plates. Wellington. xxiii + 1120 pp

 
Conradiidae
Gastropod genera